Ukrainian irredentism or Greater Ukraine refers to claims made by some Ukrainian nationalist groups to territory outside of Ukraine which they consider part of the Ukrainian national homeland.

History

Rise of nationalism
The 10 commandments of the Ukrainian People's Party (1902–1907) were developed by Ukrainian nationalist, the leader of UPP Mykola Mikhnovsky in 1904. 
These commandments were a kind of honor code for the party. They called for a one, united, indivisible, from the Carpathians to the Caucasus, independent, free, democratic Ukraine – a republic of working people.

Claimed regions
Since Mikhnovsky the idea of ‘Ukrainian Independent United State’ ( Ukrainska Samostiyna Soborna Derzhava) has been a key nationalist slogan, but many would argue that the ‘unification’ (соборність sobornist’) of Ukrainian lands was partially completed in 1939–45.

Today's would-be Ukraina irredenta is mainly in the east, on the territory that is now part of the Russian Federation:
Starodub region north of Chernihiv
South-eastern parts of Voronezh, Kursk and Rostov oblasts
Kuban region

In the west, some radical nationalists would also cover the following territories:
Transnistria, the disputed left bank of the Dniester in Moldova
Prešov region in north-eastern Slovakia
Zakerzonia (Chełm and Przemyśl) in south-eastern Poland
Brest region in south-western Belarus
Southern Bukovina and the area around Maramureș in northern Romania

Ukraine seriously claiming territories of neighbouring states is not considered possible. (Foreign claims against Ukrainian territory have been acted on in the Russian Federation's 2014 annexation of Crimea, its covert military support of separatism in the Donbas region, and aggressive rhetoric by the Russian government.) In the case of Russian–Ukrainian conflict, radical Ukrainian nationalists could try to take advantage in the north Caucasus or elsewhere.

Kuban

Ukrainians first settled the Kuban in 1792 and until the mid-twentieth century the majority of the population there identified themselves as Little Russians or Ukrainians. However the percentage of those who identified themselves as Ukrainians dropped from an official 55% (1926) to 0.9% (2002).

See also
Greater Russia
Greater Romania
Greater Bulgaria
Greater Moldova
Greater Hungary

References

External Links 
 Book - A Satellite Empire

 
Ukraine
Politics of Ukraine
Ukrainian nationalism